The 2015 Cornell Big Red football team represented Cornell University during the 2015 NCAA Division I FCS football season as a member of the Ivy League. They were led by third-year head coach David Archer and played their home games at Schoellkopf Field. Cornell finished the season 1–9 overall and 1–6 in Ivy League play to tie for seventh place. Cornell averaged 8,124 fans per game.

Schedule

Game summaries

Bucknell

Yale

Colgate

Harvard

Sacred Heart

Brown

Princeton

Dartmouth

Columbia

Penn

References

Cornell
Cornell Big Red football seasons
Cornell Big Red football